Julio Manuel Mercado Villon (born September 27, 1993 in Durán) is an Ecuadorian footballer. He currently plays midfield for Barcelona.

External links
Mercado's player card on FEF 

1993 births
Living people
People from Durán, Ecuador
Association football midfielders
Ecuadorian footballers
Barcelona S.C. footballers